Syngrapha borea is a species of looper moth in the family Noctuidae. It is found in North America.

The MONA or Hodges number for Syngrapha borea is 8934.

References

Further reading

 
 
 

Plusiini
Articles created by Qbugbot
Moths described in 1890